Voll Idrettslag is a Norwegian sports club from Voll, Rogaland. It has sections for association football, team handball, ice hockey, badminton and gymnastics.

It was established on 11 June 1969.

The men's football team currently plays in the Fourth Division, the fifth tier of Norwegian football. It last played in the Third Division in 1993.

References

 Official site 

Football clubs in Norway
Sport in Rogaland
Klepp
Association football clubs established in 1969
1969 establishments in Norway